Montjoi may refer to the following places in France:

 Montjoi, Aude, a commune in the Aude department
 Montjoi, Tarn-et-Garonne, a commune in the Tarn-et-Garonne department

See also
 Montjoie (disambiguation)